Molla Bjurstedt won the singles tennis title of the 1915 U.S. Women's National Singles Championship by defeating Hazel Hotchkiss Wightman 4–6, 6–2, 6–0 in the final of the All Comer's tournament. The defending champion, Mary Browne, did not participate in this edition and therefore no challenge round was played. The event was played on outdoor grass courts and held at the Philadelphia Cricket Club in Wissahickon Heights, Chestnut Hill, Philadelphia in the United States, from June 8 through June 13, 1915.

Draw

All Comers' finals

References

1915 in women's tennis
1915
June 1915 sports events
1915 in American women's sports
Women's Singles
Chestnut Hill, Philadelphia
1910s in Philadelphia
1915 in sports in Pennsylvania
Women's sports in Pennsylvania